Laugh is the sixth studio album by Keller Williams, released in 2002.

Track listing
 Freeker by the Speaker 4:52  
 One Hit Wonder 4:06  
 Hunting Charlie 4:01  
 Alligator Alley 4:07  
 Spring Buds 4:10  
 Mental Instra 4:39  
 Vabeeotchay 4:11  
 Bob Rules 5:41  
 Freakshow 3:06  
 Gallivanting 2:45  
 God Is My Palm Pilot 3:21  
 Crooked 5:04  
 Old Lady From Carlsbad 1:09  
 Kidney in a Cooler 6:02  
 Freeker Reprise 16:06

Credits
Mark Berger - Design, Layout Design, Package Concept  
C. Taylor Crothers - Back Cover  
Mike Crotty - Flute  
Tom Faulkner - Illustrations  
Louis Gosain - Harmony Vocals  
Danny Knicely - Mandolin  
Kevin Morris - Handclapping  
Tye North - Bass, Illustrations, Throat Singing  
Charlie Pilzer - Mastering  
Wolfe Quinn - Trombone  
Jim Robeson - Engineer, Mixing  
Dave Watts - Drums, Tracking  
Keller Williams - Guitar (Acoustic), Piano, Guitar (Electric), Vocals, Producer, Photography, Water Bowl

References

2002 albums
Keller Williams albums